San Jacinto is a town in the municipality of San Martín de Hidalgo in the state of Jalisco, Mexico. It has a population of 227 inhabitants. It is located on the foothills of the Sierra Madre Oxidental mountain chain.

References

External links
San Jacinto at PueblosAmerica.com

Populated places in Jalisco